Lists of composers by philosophical stance: Postmodernist composers

Canada
 John Oswald (born 1953)

Estonia
 Arvo Pärt (born 1935)

Finland
 Kaija Saariaho (born 1952)

France
Pierre Boulez (1925–2016)
René Leibowitz (1913–1972)
Olivier Messiaen (1908–1992)

Germany
 Hans-Jürgen von Bose (born 1953)
 Hans-Christian von Dadelsen (born 1948)
 Heiner Goebbels (born 1952)
 Wilhelm Killmayer (1927–2017)
 Detlev Müller-Siemens (born 1957)
 Wolfgang Rihm (born 1952)

Greece
 Iannis Xenakis (1922–2001)

Hungary
 György Ligeti (1923–2006)

Italy
 Luciano Berio (1925–2003)
 Aldo Clementi (1925–2011)
 Luigi Nono (1924–1990)

Norway
Marcus Paus (b. 1979)

Poland
 Henryk Górecki (1933–2010)
 Zygmunt Krauze (born 1938)

United Kingdom
 Thomas Adès (born 1971)
 Harrison Birtwistle (born 1934)
 Cornelius Cardew (1936–1981)
 Brian Eno (born 1948)
 Brian Ferneyhough (born 1943)
 John Tavener (1944–2013)

United States 
John Adams (born 1947)
 Robert Ashley (1930–2014)
Samuel Barber (1910–1981)
 William Bolcom (born 1938)
 Henry Brant (1913–2008)
 Earle Brown (1926–2002)
 John Cage (1912–1992)
 Elliott Carter (1908–2012)
 John Corigliano (born 1938)
 Morton Feldman (1926–1987)
 Philip Glass (born 1937)

See also
Modernism
Postmodernism

Sources

Postmodernist
Postmodern composers